Gregório Lopes (c. 1490 – 1550) was one of the most important Renaissance painters from Portugal.

Gregório Lopes was educated in the workshop of Jorge Afonso, the court painter of King Manuel I. Later he himself became court painter for both Manuel I and for his successor, John III. In 1514 he married the daughter of Jorge Afonso, and in 1520 was knighted by Prince Jorge de Lencastre and entered the Order of Santiago.

The work of Gregório Lopes mainly consists of painted religious altarpieces for various churches and monasteries in central Portugal. Between 1520 and 1525 he worked (together with Jorge Leal) in painting altarpieces for the Saint Francis Convent of Lisbon. Also in the 1520s he painted panels for the Church of Paraíso (Paradise), also in Lisbon. In his first fase, Gregório Lopes also worked in Sesimbra, Setúbal, and in the Monastery of Ferreirim, in this latter case together with Cristóvão de Figueiredo and Garcia Fernandes.

The painter moved in the 1530s to the city of Tomar, where he painted various panels for the Round Church of the Convent of Christ (1536–1539) and the main altarpiece of the Church of Saint John the Baptist (1538–1539). His last known works include altarpieces for the Convent of Santos-o-Novo in Lisbon (1540) and the Valverde Convent, near Évora (1545).

Many of Gregório Lopes' works can be seen in the National Museum of Ancient Art, in Lisbon. His son, Cristóvão Lopes (1516–1594), was also an artist and worked as a portrait painter for the Portuguese royal family.

References 
 Portuguese painting in the Age of Humanism (by Joaquim Oliveira Caetano).
 Portuguese Renaissance painting (by Maria José Palla).

External links 

 Paintings by Gregório Lopes (Six Centuries of Portuguese Painting website).

Portuguese painters
Portuguese male painters
1550 deaths
Court painters
1490s births
16th-century Portuguese people
Portuguese Renaissance painters
Catholic painters